Samir Amar Lacheheb (born 30 June 1988) is a French-Algerian footballer. He currently plays for ASD Lampo 1919.

Career
Lacheheb began his career in the junior ranks of several French clubs: RCF Paris, Le Havre AC and AC Ajaccio. In 2007, he signed with Serie D-side A.S.D. Cecina where he scored 12 goals in 28 games. His performances earned him a move to Ternana Calcio.

On 28 January 2008, Lacheheb was loaned out by Ternana to Inter Milan's Primavera team for 6 months with Inter having a buy option at the end of the loan. However, he returned to Ternana at the end of his loan period.

On 12 January 2012, Lacheheb was sold to Aprilia.

On 23 August 2013, Lacheheb was sold to U.S.D. Noto Calcio.

On 5 December 2013, Lacheheb was sold to F.C. Turris Neapolis 1944.

References

External links
 Ternana Profile 
 Football.it Profile 

1988 births
Algerian footballers
Algerian expatriates in Italy
Expatriate footballers in Italy
Inter Milan players
French footballers
French expatriate footballers
French expatriate sportspeople in Italy
French sportspeople of Algerian descent
Living people
Ternana Calcio players
A.S.D. Olimpia Colligiana players
Footballers from Paris
Association football midfielders